The 2022–23 season of the 2. Frauen-Bundesliga is the 19th season of Germany's second-tier women's football league. It runs from 16 September 2022 to 29 May 2023.

The fixtures were announced on 5 July 2022.

Teams

Team changes

Stadiums

League table

Results

Top scorers

References

External links

2022–23
2022–23 in German women's football leagues
Current association football seasons